Oakmont High School is located at 1710 Cirby Way, in Roseville, California, United States. The school is surrounded by the communities of Citrus Heights, Rocklin, Granite Bay, and Antelope. It is one of five comprehensive high schools in the Roseville Joint Union High School District. Oakmont opened in September 1966.

Academics

Advanced placement classes 
During the 2008–2009 school year, 200 students took Advanced Placement exams. According to the California Department of Education, approximately 47% of the exams taken that year were scored a “3” or better.

Alternative courses 

The school also offers the International Baccalaureate (IB) Diploma and the Health Careers Academy. The latter is a three-year college preparatory program for students who want to explore working in healthcare.

Notable alumni

 Dan Bunz – NFL linebacker for the Super Bowl Champion San Francisco 49ers
Brendan Burch – CEO of Six Point Harness
 Preston Guilmet – professional baseball player
 Tim McCord – bass guitarist and songwriter for the rock band Evanescence
 Rich Rodas – professional baseball player
 Summer Sanders – world champion swimmer and Olympic Gold medalist

References

External links
 School Website
 Roseville Joint Union High School District Website
 Oakmont High School Theatre

Public high schools in California
International Baccalaureate schools in California
High schools in Placer County, California
Buildings and structures in Roseville, California
1965 establishments in California